Rudolf Blass (born October 5, 1948 in Saarlouis) is a West German sprint canoer who competed in the early to mid-1970s. He won two silver medals at the ICF Canoe Sprint World Championships, earning them 1971 (K-4 1000 m) and 1973 (K-4 10000 m).

Blass also competed in two Summer Olympics, earning his best finish of fifth in the K-4 1000 m event at Munich in 1972.

References

Sports-reference.com profile

1948 births
People from Saarlouis
Canoeists at the 1972 Summer Olympics
Canoeists at the 1976 Summer Olympics
German male canoeists
Living people
Olympic canoeists of West Germany
ICF Canoe Sprint World Championships medalists in kayak
Sportspeople from Saarland